Outland is the fourth studio album by the British rock band Spear of Destiny, released by 10 Records in 1987 (see 1987 in music).

It included the hit single "Never Take Me Alive" which reached No. 14 on the UK Singles Chart in 1987 - Spear of Destiny's only Top 20 hit in the UK. Three other singles were released from the album, namely "Strangers in Our Town", "Was That You?" and "The Traveller", all making the UK Top 50.

Track listing
All songs written by Kirk Brandon.

Side one
 "Outlands" - 5:19
 "Land of Shame" - 3:19
 "The Traveller" - 4:49
 "Was That You?" - 3:58

Side two
 "Strangers in Our Town" - 3:55
 "The Whole World's Waiting" - 4:57
 "Tonight" - 4:31
 "Miami Vice" - 4:57
 "Never Take Me Alive" - 4:15

CD bonus tracks
 "Time of Our Lives" (Original version) - 4:27
 "Pumpkin Man" - 5:10
 "Embassy Song" - 4:18
 "The Man That Never Was" - 3:18
 "Jack Straw" - 4:26

Personnel
Spear of Destiny
Kirk Brandon - vocals, guitar
Pete Barnacle - drums
Steve Barnacle - bass guitar, fretless bass, keyboards
Marco Pirroni - guitar, 12-string guitar
Volker Janssen - keyboards
Mick Proctor - guitar
Technical
Neill King - engineer, mixer
Chris Welch - cover illustration

1987 albums
Spear of Destiny (band) albums